YAI may stand for:
 Yachting Association of India, the governing body for sailing in India
 Youth Action International, a non-profit organization
 You Am I, an Australian rock band
YAI: Seeing Beyond Disability, a non-profit organization that serves people with intellectual and developmental disabilities

Yai may refer to:
 Yai River, Thailand

YAI or yai may also be an official code:
 IATA airport code YAI: General Bernardo O'Higgins Airport, Chillán, Chile
 ISO 639-3 language code yai: Yaghnobi language, a living, East Iranian language

People with the given name or surname Yai include:
 Yai Nilwong (born 1985), Thai footballer
 Anok Yai (born 1997), American fashion model of South Sudanese descent

See also

 
 YA (disambiguation)
 Yao (disambiguation)